Shek Kwu Chau is an island of Hong Kong, located south of Lantau Island and between Cheung Chau and the Soko Islands. Administratively, it is part of Islands District.

Shek Kwu Chau is a restricted area and a permit is required to visit the island.

History
An old name for the island was "Coffin Island". It was generally barren and uninhabited until 1962, when it was taken over by the Society for the Aid and Rehabilitation of Drug Abusers.

Features
Shek Kwu Chau Treatment and Rehabilitation Centre is located on Shek Kwu Chau. It is managed by the Society for the Aid and Rehabilitation of Drug Abusers (SARDA).

Incinerator
The Hong Kong government is building an Integrated Waste Management Facilities on a newly created artificial island south of Shek Kwu Chau and west of Cheung Chau, scheduled to be completed in 2018. The government says the incinerator will be able to treat about 3,000 tonnes of waste a day. Secretary for the Environment Edward Yau said the site was chosen over Tsang Tsui in Tuen Mun partly because of the shorter transportation time and the lower impact on the neighbourhood.

On 26 July 2013, the High Court rejected a legal bid to stop construction of the incinerator, brought by Cheung Chau resident Leung Hon-wai.

Transport
Shek Kwu Chau is a 20-minute ferry ride from Cheung Chau.

See also

 Christian Zheng Sheng College

References

External links

 Shek Kwu Chau Vietnamese Boat People Detention Centre
 Shek Kwu Chau's Drug Rehabilitation Centre "Hong Kong's first wind/solar hybrid system"
 Restricted Islands - TV program by the Radio Television Hong Kong on Shek Kwu Chau and Hei Ling Chau

Islands of Hong Kong
Islands District
Populated places in Hong Kong